Tang Hetian (born 23 December 1975), formerly known as Tang Yongshu (唐永淑), is a badminton player who competed internationally for China in the 1990s. She played for Australia in the 2000s as He Tian Tang.

Career
Specializing in women's doubles, Tang earned a bronze medal at the 1995 IBF World Championships and a silver medal at the 1997 IBF World Championships with her regular partner, Qin Yiyuan. Tang and Qin were also bronze medalists at the 1996 Atlanta Olympics, yet they were overshadowed by fellow countrywomen Ge Fei and Gu Jun, the dominant women's doubles team of the day, who took gold at the latter two events. Tang won women's doubles at the 1995 Canadian Open in an unusual partnership with South Korea's Gil Young-ah (as players on the Chinese national squad rarely partner with foreign players). Tang and Qin won women's doubles at the 1997 Thailand Open and played together on the Chinese team that reclaimed the Uber Cup (women's world team championship trophy) from Indonesia in 1998.

After 1998, Tang retired from the Chinese national badminton team and later married her national teammate Yu Qi. They immigrated to Australia in the early 2000s. Tang played for the Australia national badminton team at the Delhi 2010 Commonwealth Games, where she won a bronze medal in the women's doubles event. The same year, she also represented Australia in the Uber Cup.

At the 2014 Oceania Badminton Championships, Tang won a gold medal in the mixed team event and a bronze in women's doubles.

Major achievements
Representing China.

Representing Australia.

References

External links

1975 births
Living people
Badminton players from Chongqing
Chinese female badminton players
Australian female badminton players
Chinese emigrants to Australia
Australian sportspeople of Chinese descent
Olympic badminton players of China
Badminton players at the 1996 Summer Olympics
Olympic medalists in badminton
Medalists at the 1996 Summer Olympics
Olympic bronze medalists for China
Badminton players at the 1998 Asian Games
Medalists at the 1998 Asian Games
Asian Games medalists in badminton
Asian Games bronze medalists for China
Badminton players at the 2010 Commonwealth Games
Badminton players at the 2014 Commonwealth Games
Commonwealth Games medallists in badminton
Commonwealth Games bronze medallists for Australia
Medallists at the 2010 Commonwealth Games